Northwood may refer to:

Places

Australia 
Northwood, New South Wales
Northwood, Victoria

Canada 
Northwood, Thunder Bay, Ontario, a neighbourhood in the city of Thunder Bay

United Kingdom 
Northwood, Derbyshire, a location in the U.K.
Northwood, Isle of Wight
Northwood, Kent, Ramsgate, Thanet, Kent
Northwood, London, in the London Borough of Hillingdon
Northwood, Merseyside, a district of Kirkby, Merseyside
Northwood, Shropshire, a location in the U.K.
Northwood, Stafford, a location in the U.K.
Northwood, Stoke-on-Trent, Staffordshire
Northwood Headquarters, Eastbury, Hertfordshire
North Hayling, Hampshire, formerly called "Northwood"
Great North Wood a former natural oak woodland located in what is now south London.

United States 
Northwood, Irvine, California
Northwood, Delaware, a place in Delaware
Northwood, Iowa
Northwood, Baltimore, Maryland
Northwood, New Hampshire
Northwood, North Dakota
Northwood, Ohio, in Wood County
Northwood, Logan County, Ohio
Northwood, Philadelphia, Pennsylvania, a Northeast Philadelphia neighborhood

Education
Northwood High School (disambiguation), multiple schools
Northwood School (disambiguation), multiple schools
Northwood College, a girls' school in Northwood, London
Northwood University, a private university with locations in many U.S. states

Other uses
Northwood (TV series), drama series that ran on Canadian Broadcasting Corporation
Joseph Northwood (1809–1886), Canadian businessman and politician
Operation Northwoods, a 1962 secret U.S. military plan to fake Cuban military aggressions on America's Guantanamo base
Northwood, a central processing unit (CPU) core series produced by Intel

See also

Norwood (disambiguation)